Karen Dale Eggeling (born April 21, 1954) is an American professional golfer who played on the LPGA Tour. She also played under her maiden name of Dale Lundquist.

Eggeling won three times on the LPGA Tour between 1980 and 1998.

Professional wins (4)

LPGA Tour wins (3)

LPGA Tour playoff record (1–1)

Other wins (1)
1982 Florida Women's Open

References

External links

American female golfers
LPGA Tour golfers
Golfers from Georgia (U.S. state)
Golfers from Tampa, Florida
Miami Dade College alumni
University of South Florida alumni
People from Statesboro, Georgia
1954 births
Living people
21st-century American women